Magnus Jensen may refer to:

 Magnus Jensen (footballer) (born 1996), Danish football player
 Magnus Jensen (historian) (1992–1990), Norwegian resistance leader
 Magnus Jensen (Queensland politician) (1857–1915), Australian politician